Barbara Leff (born May 14, 1947) is an American politician who served in the Arizona House of Representatives from the 24th district from 1997 to 2003 and in the Arizona Senate from the 11th district from 2003 to 2011.

References

1947 births
Living people
Politicians from New York City
Women state legislators in Arizona
Republican Party members of the Arizona House of Representatives
Republican Party Arizona state senators
21st-century American women